Jamara Riashonn "Shonn" Bell (Born October 25, 1974) is an American former Arena football & indoor football defensive lineman. He played college football at Clinch Valley College.

Early life
Bell was born in Waynesboro, Virginia. Bell played most of his high school football in Germany while his father was stationed there in the Army. His senior year of high school he was moved back to Virginia where he attended Stuarts Draft High School in Stuarts Draft, Virginia.

College career
Upon his graduation, Bell only received attention from Clinch Valley College. Realizing it was his only opportunity, Bell accepted his scholarship to Clinch Valley. Bell finished his career with the Highland Cavaliers with 84 receptions for 1,224 yards and 16 touchdowns. He was an NAIA All-American tight end and All-Virginia tight end.

Professional career

Houston Oilers

San Francisco 49ers

Quad City Steamwheelers
From 2006 to 2007, Bell played for the Quad City Steamwheelers of af2.

Fort Wayne Freedom
In 2008, Bell played with the Fort Wayne Freedom of the Continental Indoor Football League.

Bloomington Extreme
In 2010, Bell signed with the Bloomington Extreme of the Indoor Football League.

Chicago Knights

Coaching career
Bell currently serves as the Defensive Coordinator for the Quad City Raiders, a minor league football team in the MFA.

References

1974 births
Living people
American football tight ends
Houston Oilers players
San Francisco 49ers players
Quad City Steamwheelers players
Chicago Knights players
Bloomington Edge players
Chicago Blitz (indoor football) players
Virginia–Wise Cavaliers football players
American football defensive linemen
Players of American football from Virginia
People from Waynesboro, Virginia